Moira Anita Senior (born 22 July 1976 in New Plymouth, New Zealand) is a field hockey striker from New Zealand, who finished sixth with her national team at the 2000 Summer Olympics in Sydney. She competed at the Commonwealth games either side of the Sydney Olympics, at the 1998 Commonwealth Games in Kuala Lumpur and the 2002 Commonwealth Games in Manchester. Injury suspended her career until a return to international hockey in late 2004 when she was named in the Champions Trophy side after completing the 2004 NHL as one of the top goal scorers. She scored eight goals for the Central Mysticks, who won the women's title.

Senior missed selection for the USA tour in May 2005 to make way for developing players but was recalled to the side for the Champions Challenge in Virginia Beach in July. A shin injury prevented her from making the trip. She is one out of three players who survived from the Sydney team. The others are Diana Weavers and Suzie Muirhead.

International senior competitions
 1998 – World Cup, Utrecht
 1998 – Commonwealth Games, Kuala Lumpur
 1999 – Champions Trophy, Brisbane
 2000 – Olympic Qualifying Tournament, Milon Keynes
 2000 – Champions Trophy, Amstelveen
 2000 – Summer Olympics, Sydney
 2002 – Commonwealth Games, Manchester
 2004 – Champions Trophy, Rosario

References

External links

New Zealand female field hockey players
Olympic field hockey players of New Zealand
Field hockey players at the 2000 Summer Olympics
1976 births
Living people
Sportspeople from New Plymouth
Commonwealth Games bronze medallists for New Zealand
Field hockey players at the 1998 Commonwealth Games
Commonwealth Games medallists in field hockey
Medallists at the 1998 Commonwealth Games